Helvibotys sinaloensis is a moth in the family Crambidae. It is found in Mexico (Sinaloa).

The wingspan is 15–17 mm. The fore- and hindwings are uniform brownish yellow.

References

Moths described in 1967
Pyraustinae